Ralna Eve English is an American-born singer (born June 19, 1942) from Haskell, Texas. She gained fame as half of the husband-and-wife singing duo of Guy & Ralna with then-husband Guy Hovis, both of whom were featured performers on The Lawrence Welk Show.

Early life 
She was raised in Lubbock, Texas, where, as a teenager, she won a local battle of the bands competition with her group "Ralna and the Ad-Libs". One of her competitors was legendary rock star Buddy Holly, a Lubbock native. After attending Texas Tech University, and singing jingles for television commercials in Dallas, she relocated to California in the late 1960s, where she performed regularly at The Horn nightclub in Santa Monica.

Career 
While working at The Horn nightclub, she met fellow aspiring performer Guy Hovis, a native of Mississippi. They were married on January 25, 1969.

Later that year, she joined Lawrence Welk on his television program originally as a soloist. In the first year, husband Guy joined the program, and for the next thirteen years, until the show ended its run in 1982, Guy & Ralna became one of the most popular acts on the show.

English also stood at the bedside of fellow performer Jo Ann Castle after Castle suffered a drug overdose and stroke in 2005.

In March 2007, English's solo TV special, Ralna English: From My Heart premiered nationally on PBS. In the special, a fundraiser for PBS, she performed with a 75-piece orchestra and 100-voice choir.

In 2007, English also published a "Ralna English Family Cookbook", which was offered to viewers who purchased DVDs of her TV special. Recipes are from her two sisters, Sharon and Jane, as well as her aunts, grandmother, mother and other relatives.

Now living in Scottsdale, Arizona, English still maintains a busy concert schedule, either performing as a solo act, or with her ex-husband, Hovis.

Personal life 
English and Hovis divorced in 1984 but have continued to perform together in concert venues. They are the parents of a daughter Julie (born 1977). English remained single, but Hovis has since remarried.

References

External links
Ralna English

1942 births
Living people
People from Haskell, Texas
People from Lubbock, Texas
Lubbock High School alumni
Texas Tech University alumni
Big band singers
American gospel singers
American women country singers
American country singer-songwriters
Musicians from Scottsdale, Arizona
Singers from Los Angeles
Lawrence Welk
American United Methodists
Singer-songwriters from California
Singer-songwriters from Arizona
Singer-songwriters from Texas